The Ministry of Information and Tourism was a ministerial department of the Government of Spain created in 1951 during the dictatorship of Francisco Franco to control information and the censorship to press and radio. The ministry also assumed the management of Tourism, an important industry at that time when it had an important flowering. In historiography, some authors consider it as a simple Ministry of Propaganda.

History

Background 
The need to inform public opinion of the government's action had its beginnings in 1918 with the creation of the Ministry of Public Instruction and Fine Arts that had an Information Office. With the dictatorship of Primo de Rivera, two successive organizations are created; first the Bureau for Information and Press Censorship, during the Military Directory (1923), and the next one in the Civil Directory (1925) with the Cabinet for Information and Press Censorship. During the Second Republic, a Press Section is created in the General Secretariat of the President of the Republic (1932) and already during the Civil War, prime minister Largo Caballero created the Ministry of Propaganda that had an ephemeral life.

Department 
The Department of Information and Tourism was created by a Decree-Law of 19 July 1951. The ministry assumed the competences over media and entertainment —press, cinematography and theater and broadcasting— that until then were attributed to the Undersecretariat of Popular Education, whose head was Manuel Arburúa de la Miyar, while those of tourism had been attributed to the Directorate-General for Tourism, whose director-general had been, since its creation in 1938 and for fifteen years, Luis Bolín and that until then depended on the Ministry of Home Affairs. Another of the bodies that came to depend on the ministry was the National Delegation of Press, Propaganda and Radio, a body that was in charge of the media controlled by the Falange —such as the Movement Press Group or the Network of Broadcasters of the Movement—.

The ministry was abolished during the Spanish transition to democracy, assuming the Office of the Spokesperson the powers relating to information and the Ministry of Commerce those of tourism. The tourism powers are currently managed by the Ministry of Industry, Trade and Tourism.

List of ministers

References 

Defunct departments of the Spanish Government
Propaganda organizations
Ministries established in 1951
1951 establishments in Spain
1977 disestablishments in Spain
Censorship in Spain